Giulia Riva (born 31 January 1992) is an Italian sprinter. She competed in the 4 × 100 metres relay event at the 2015 World Championships in Athletics in Beijing, China.

See also
 Italian all-time lists - 4x100 metres relay

References

External links

1992 births
Living people
Italian female sprinters
World Athletics Championships athletes for Italy
Place of birth missing (living people)
Athletes (track and field) at the 2019 European Games
European Games medalists in athletics
European Games bronze medalists for Italy
Athletics competitors of Fiamme Oro